Jesper Gustavsson (born 29 October 1994) is a Swedish footballer who plays as a midfielder for Mjällby AIF. He made his debut in Allsvenskan for Mjällby on 19 August 2013 as an 18-year-old against Helsingborgs IF.

References

External links

MAIF profile
Jesper Gustavsson at Fotbolltransfers.com

1994 births
Living people
Mjällby AIF players
Swedish footballers
Allsvenskan players
FK Mjølner players
Swedish expatriate footballers
Swedish expatriate sportspeople in Norway
Association football midfielders